Stuart Harris (born 12 August 1943) is a New Zealand cricketer. He played in one first-class match for Northern Districts in 1975/76.

See also
 List of Northern Districts representative cricketers

References

External links
 

1943 births
Living people
New Zealand cricketers
Northern Districts cricketers
Cricketers from New Plymouth